Stranger by the Lake is a 2013 French erotic thriller drama film written and directed by Alain Guiraudie. The film premiered in the Un Certain Regard section at the 2013 Cannes Film Festival where Guiraudie won the award for Best Director. The film also won the Queer Palm award, and was mentioned on multiple top-ten lists of the best films of 2014.

Plot
Franck is a regular visitor to a nude beach and the woods surrounding it, both of which are a popular cruising destination for gay men. He befriends Henri, an older man who seeks solitude at the beach after breaking up with his girlfriend, and Michel, a handsome man to whom Franck is instantly attracted.

One evening, Franck observes Michel drowning another man in the lake. Though terrified by what he has seen, Franck is unable to resist his attraction to Michel, and continues to pursue him. When the body of the drowned man is discovered and identified, a police investigator begins to question the men at the beach; Franck tells the investigator that he did not see anything unusual on the evening the man drowned. Franck and Michel's relationship progresses, though Franck becomes increasingly frustrated by Michel's refusal to meet him anywhere other than at the beach.

Henri, who has correctly intuited the events that have occurred over the past several days, warns Franck about Michel. When Franck goes swimming, Henri confronts Michel, and tells him that he knows he is the murderer. Henri leaves to take a walk in the woods, casting a glance back at Michel as he departs. When Franck returns, he discovers that the beach is suddenly deserted. He enters the woods, where he sees Michel walking away from a patch of tall grass. Upon entering the grass, he finds Henri, whose throat has been slit. Henri tells him that he got what he wanted. Franck, now being pursued by Michel, runs into the woods to hide. He sees Michel run into the inspector, whom he stabs in the stomach with a knife.

Night falls, and Franck remains in hiding. Michel calls out to Franck, saying that he needs his love and wants to spend the night with him. Franck does not respond, and Michel walks away to search for him deeper in the woods. After a time, Franck stands up from his hiding place, and calls out Michel's name repeatedly.

Cast
 Pierre Deladonchamps as Franck
 Christophe Paou as Michel
 Patrick d'Assumçao as Henri
 Jérôme Chappatte as Inspector Damroder

Production

The film contained unsimulated sex, which was filmed using body doubles. Guiraudie and the actors came to the decision that they would be uncomfortable filming the scenes themselves. The film was shot at the Lake of Sainte-Croix in Provence, in September 2012.

Release
The film was screened in the Contemporary World Cinema section at the 2013 Toronto International Film Festival.

Reception
Stranger by the Lake received widespread critical acclaim. The review aggregation website Rotten Tomatoes gives the film a 94% rating, based on reviews from 93 critics, with an average score of 7.75/10. The website's critical consensus reads: "Sexy, smart, and darkly humorous, Stranger by the Lake offers rewarding viewing for adult filmgoers in search of thought-provoking drama." Metacritic gives a score of 82 based on 26 critics, indicating "universal acclaim".

Reviewing on Roger Ebert's website, Michał Oleszczyk awards the film four out of four stars, praising Guiraudie's directing and the acting of the cast. He writes: "Stranger by the Lake is the sexiest and most elegant thriller in years..."

The Village Voice film critic Melissa Anderson calls the film "Guiraudie's most sexually explicit and narratively taut work," adding that "the writer-director's attention to the anarchic pull of lust, simultaneously celebrated and reproved here, is sharper than ever."

In January 2014, the film was nominated for eight César Awards at the 39th César Awards, with Pierre Deladonchamps winning the award for Most Promising Actor.

Top ten lists

The film was chosen as the best film of 2013 by French film magazine Cahiers du cinéma. It also appeared on several American film critics' 2014 top ten lists.

 1st – Michał Oleszczyk, RogerEbert.com
 2nd – Reverse Shot
 2nd – Slant Magazine
 3rd – Alan Zilberman, RogerEbert.com
 4th – Eugene Hernandez, Film Society of Lincoln Center
 4th – Nicholas Bell, IONCINEMA.com
 5th – Matt Mueller
 6th – Zachary Wigon, Village Voice
 7th – Aaron Hillis, Village Voice
 8th – Ignatiy Vishnevetsky, The A.V. Club
 9th – Little White Lies
 10th – Jay Kuehner, Fandor
 10th – Wesley Morris, GrantlandSee also
 List of lesbian, gay, bisexual or transgender-related films of 2013

References

External links
 
 
 
 
 
 Alain Guiraudie's 'Stranger by the Lake', Chris Palazzolo on Stranger by the Lake, Rochford Street Review'' (Issue 16 2015).

2013 films
2013 LGBT-related films
2013 thriller drama films
2010s erotic drama films
2010s erotic thriller films
2010s French-language films
Arte France Cinéma films
Films directed by Alain Guiraudie
Films set on beaches
Films set on lakes
Films shot in France
French erotic drama films
French erotic thriller films
French LGBT-related films
French thriller drama films
Gay-related films
LGBT-related thriller drama films
Queer Palm winners
2010s French films